Lieskovec is a village and municipality in Humenné District in the Prešov Region of north-east Slovakia.

History
In historical records the village was first mentioned in 1430.

Geography
The municipality lies at an altitude of 160 metres and covers an area of 9.706 km².
It has a population of about 455 people.

External links
 
 https://web.archive.org/web/20070513023228/http://www.statistics.sk/mosmis/eng/run.html

Villages and municipalities in Humenné District